Carcinarachne is a monotypic genus of South American crab spiders containing the single species, Carcinarachne brocki. It was first described by Günter E. W. Schmidt in 1956, and has only been found in Ecuador.

See also
 List of Thomisidae species

References

Monotypic Araneomorphae genera
Spiders of South America
Thomisidae